Baris is a genus of weevils.

Species include:
Baris abrupta
Baris aeneomicans    
Baris aerea  
Baris amnicola
Baris ancilla
Baris aperta   
Baris arizonica
Baris ashevillensis
Baris blatchleyi 
Baris brunneipes  
Baris callida
Baris canadensis
Baris carolinensis
Baris caudalis
Baris cauta
Baris cirsii
Baris columbiana
Baris confinis 
Baris cruda
Baris deformis
Baris denverensis
Baris dilatata
Baris discipula
Baris esuriens
Baris exigua  
Baris floridensis
Baris fracta
Baris futilis
Baris genitiva
Baris gravida
Baris grossacavis
Baris heterodoxa
Baris hispidula
Baris humerosa
Baris hyperion
Baris inconspicua
Baris ingens
Baris intacta
Baris interstitialis
Baris irregularis
Baris lanosella
Baris lengi  
Baris lepidii
Baris macra
Baris meraca
Baris metasternalis
Baris minuens
Baris mobilensis
Baris modicella
Baris monardae
Baris monticola
Baris neptis
Baris nevadica
Baris nitida
Baris novella
Baris obsequens
Baris opacula
Baris oviculata
Baris palmensis
Baris persola
Baris porosicollis
Baris probata
Baris pruinina
Baris punctiventris
Baris pupilla
Baris rostrina
Baris rubripes
Baris rusticula
Baris scintillans
Baris sculptiventris
Baris sejuncta
Baris seminola
Baris socialis
Baris soluta
Baris sparsa
Baris splendens
Baris stacesmithi
Baris striata
Baris subexilis
Baris subovalis
Baris subsimilis
Baris subtropica
Baris tecta
Baris tenuestriata
Baris texana
Baris transversa
Baris tuckeri
Baris umbilicata    
Baris vespertina  
Baris virginica 
Baris vitreola
Baris xanthii

References 

Baridinae genera